The Leeds City Council election took place on 4 May 2000 to elect members of City of Leeds Metropolitan Borough Council in West Yorkshire, England. Since the last election, Labour had lost a by-election to the Lib Dems in Harehills, and long-serving Chapel Allerton councillor, Garth Frankland, had defected from Labour to Left Alliance. One third of the council was up for election and the Labour party stayed in overall control of the council. Overall turnout in the election was 27.5%.

Election result

This result had the following consequences for the total number of seats on the council after the elections:

Ward results

By-elections between 2000 and 2002

References

2000 English local elections
2000
Lee